John Joseph Manning (11 December 1940 – 17 February 2021) was an English footballer who played as a forward for numerous clubs between 1962 and 1976.

Career
In the 1960–61 season, Manning played for a Liverpool youth team, before moving to Tranmere Rovers. Between 1962 and 1976, Manning played for Tranmere Rovers, Shrewsbury Town, Norwich City, Bolton Wanderers, Walsall,  Crewe Alexandra, and Barnsley. In 1967, Manning signed for Norwich, for a fee of £21,000. and made 60 league appearances for them over two seasons, scoring 21 goals. Including other fixtures, he played 67 matches for Norwich, scoring 22 goals. In March 1969, Manning left Norwich City to join Bolton Wanderers, as he wanted to return to North West England to be closer to his family in Liverpool. He had two spells at Tranmere, where he scored over 70 goals, and also at Crewe. He also spent time playing in South Africa for Port Elizabeth City.

After retiring as a player, Manning was a coach for Crewe, before becoming a coach of the Saudi Arabia under-19s team, working with Jimmy Hill. He later worked as a scout for Birmingham City, Brighton & Hove Albion and Middlesbrough.

Personal life and death
Manning was born on 11 December 1940 in Liverpool, England. Aside from football, he was a sales manager for a chemicals company. 

In later life, Manning suffered from Alzheimer's disease. His death was announced on 17 February 2021, at the age of 80.

References

1940 births
2021 deaths
Footballers from Liverpool
Association football forwards
English footballers
Liverpool F.C. players
Tranmere Rovers F.C. players
Shrewsbury Town F.C. players
Norwich City F.C. players
Bolton Wanderers F.C. players
Walsall F.C. players
Crewe Alexandra F.C. players
Barnsley F.C. players
English Football League players
Crewe Alexandra F.C. non-playing staff
Birmingham City F.C. non-playing staff
Brighton & Hove Albion F.C. non-playing staff
Middlesbrough F.C. non-playing staff
English expatriate footballers
English expatriates in South Africa
Expatriate soccer players in South Africa
Port Elizabeth City F.C. players